Somosomo is a chiefly village in Taveuni, which is the island where the International Date Line crosses on land in Fiji. This island is part of the Cakaudrove Province and the holders of the title of Tui Cakau, the Paramount Chief of the Tovata Confederacy, are historically and traditionally linked to this village.

The island was visited by the US Exploring Expedition in 1840.
 
The builders included Manase Gauamo, an expert Tongan canoe maker, who worked for five years to complete Ramarama. The double-canoe was built for the Tui Cakau, who later gave Ramarama to Seru Epenisa Cakobau. The double-canoe made three voyages to Tonga.

Famous persons from Somosomo 
Fiji's first President, Penaia Ganilau, was Tui Cakau and therefore a native of Somosomo.

Chief Komaibatiniwai was from the noble family of Somosomo.

Rugby league player Semi Radradra hails from the village.

Mythology 
According to the myth, god who ruled over this village is Qurai. There is a short discussion of traditional religion as practiced on Somosomo in J. G. Frazer's famous work, The Golden Bough. Frazer describes belief in a continuity of divine nature between humans and deities, in which certain priests and chiefs were considered to be "sacred persons."

Notes 

Cakaudrove Province
Populated places in Fiji
Taveuni